Tyrannosaur is a 2011 British drama film written and directed by Paddy Considine and starring Peter Mullan, Olivia Colman, Eddie Marsan, Paul Popplewell and Sally Carman.

Plot
In a drunken rage, unemployed widower Joseph kicks his dog Bluey to death, which he immediately regrets. After burying Bluey, he goes to the post office, where he causes a confrontation with several Pakistani employees and later attacks three men who were teasing him at his local pub. After fleeing the pub, he hides in a second-hand shop, where a compassionate employee, Hannah, offers to pray for him. Joseph later returns home and encounters his six-year-old neighbor Samuel, who is forced to wait outside his own house while his mother is inside with her abusive boyfriend. The next morning, Joseph wakes up and goes to Hannah's shop where she tends to his injuries. Despite her compassion, he begins to berate and insult her. She listens to him without commenting but her eyes fill with tears.

Hannah returns home, drinks wine and falls asleep. When her husband James arrives and is unable to awaken her, he urinates on her. After Hannah arrives at work the next morning, Joseph comes by to apologize for his behavior the previous day, and they go for a drink. That night, James tells Hannah that someone saw her earlier that day with another man, which she denies. When Hannah comes to work the following morning with a black eye, she tells Joseph that she fell in the bath. Later on, in the back room, she drinks from a bottle of vodka. Joseph later returns to the shop once again to ask Hannah to join him to pray for his best friend Jack, who is dying of cancer. Jack dies a few days later and Joseph returns to get a suit for his funeral. James enters and finds Hannah tying Joseph's tie as he tries on a suit and quietly threatens her. Joseph hears enough of this to realize that James was the cause of Hannah's black eye. She continues to claim that she simply fell in the tub but she is visibly upset. She asks Joseph to immediately leave the store.

After work, Hannah is afraid to go home for fear of what her husband will do to her. With nowhere else to go, she finds a bar and drinks alone. Upon discovering her location, James comes to pick her up which leads to a violent altercation back at home, in which James brutally rapes Hannah at knifepoint until she blacks out. The next day, Hannah leaves home, finds Joseph and tells him she is leaving James, asking to stay with him because she has nowhere else to go. He hesitatingly agrees, and in the course of her settling in, Joseph reveals that his heavy-set wife has been dead for 5 years due to complications from her diabetes. He also tells Hannah that he regrets using the nickname "Tyrannosaur" for his wife. He used it because it reminded Joseph of the scene in the film Jurassic Park where the Tyrannosaurus rex could be heard stomping after the children in the film, much like how his wife sounded when she was walking up the stairs of their house. At the time, he'd thought it was funny but he expresses guilt for the way he treated her. After a few days, Joseph tells her that she is not safe with him and suggests she leave. Joseph escorts Hannah back to her house to retrieve some personal items, but Hannah ends up running away, saying she is not ready to confront her husband. Later that day, after attending the wake of an old friend, Joseph decides to confront James. He takes Hannah's keys and goes to her house where he finds James's corpse propped up against the closet door. Shocked, he returns home and confronts Hannah, saying that he knows she killed her husband. At first she is confused, but then breaks down and reveals that James had been brutally abusing her for a long time.

A year later, it is revealed that Hannah is in prison. Joseph tells her in a letter that Samuel was mauled by his mother's boyfriend's dog. In retaliation, Joseph beheaded the dog with a machete. He also admits that he had always admired her from afar, as she was the only person in town to smile at him and show him kindness, which is why he had approached her in the first place. Despite everything, they both appear hopeful for a better future.

Cast

Production
Tyrannosaur is an expansion of Dog Altogether, a short film for Warp Films that Considine wrote and directed, which won the Best Short Film BAFTA and BIFA awards as well as the Silver Lion award at Venice in 2007. The film received a grant of £206,540 from the National Lottery fund through the UK Film Council. The remainder of the film's budget came from Warp X, Inflammable Films, Film4, Screen Yorkshire, EM Media, and Optimum Releasing (StudioCanal). It depicts an environment similar to what Considine witnessed growing up on a council estate in the Midlands, although the film is in no way autobiographical. The film's title is a metaphor, the meaning of which is revealed in the film.

The film is set in an unspecified town in the North of England, although much of it was shot on location in residential areas of Leeds and Wakefield, including Seacroft, Cross Gates, Eccup, Harehills and Alwoodley, and the accents of many of the main characters are drawn from a wide geographical area. The film  makes reference to the fictional Manners Estate as an area in the town where the more wealthy inhabitants reside. Manners Estate is the name of the council estate in the parish of Winshill near Burton-on-Trent where Paddy Considine grew up.

Many of the extras used in the film were local residents, including local busker Chris Wheat who was given a part after singing to the cast and crew on set. He performs his own original song in the film. Workers from the local St Vincent's Charity Shop used in the film were also given small parts. Several other small roles were given to members of the crew, including the film's producer Diarmid Scrimshaw, the film's make-up designer Nadia Stacey, and the production coordinator Samantha Milnes who was featured in a photo as Joseph's late wife. The film is dedicated to Considine's late mother, Pauline Considine. The end credits gives special thanks to both James Marsh and Gary Oldman.

Soundtrack
The film contained the following tracks. Original music was composed by Chris Baldwin and Dan Baker.
"Wand'rin' Star" – Nick Hemming (of The Leisure Society), cover of Lee Marvin's 1969 hit song from the western musical film Paint Your Wagon
"This Gun Loves you Back" – Chris Baldwin (written By Paddy Considine & Chris Baldwin)
"Truth or Glory" – JJ All Stars
"Saturday Night" – JJ All Stars
"Psycho Mash" – JJ All Stars
"Hi Jack" – Chris Wheat
"Sing All Our Cares Away" – Damien Dempsey
"We Were Wasted" – The Leisure Society

Reception

Box office
The film grossed £396,930, below its £750,000 production budget.

Critical response
Tyrannosaur received positive reviews. On Rotten Tomatoes, it holds an approval rating of 83%, based on 88 reviews. The critical consensus states: "Tyrannosaur is a brutal, frank, and ultimately rewarding story of violent men seeking far-off redemption." The film also has a score of 65 out of 100 based on 18 critics on Metacritic, indicating "Generally favourable reviews".

Kim Newman of Empire wrote the "character study is as gripping as any hardboiled thriller, delivering emotional content that'll stay with you for a long time", and gave it 4/5 stars. Peter Bradshaw of The Guardian also awarded the film 4 out of 5 stars and wrote, "I have heard Tyrannosaur criticised as a movie that comes too close to miserablist cliche, but that isn't true: it's a visceral, considered dissection of abuse and rage and the dysfunctional relationships that rage creates, which, in turn, perpetuate that rage, and an examination of people who create their own eco-system of anger and unhappiness. The performances of Mullan, Colman and Marsan are excellent and create a compelling human drama. Tyrannosaur is far from a love story, but it is not a simply a hate story, either; it is certainly a very impressive debut from Considine." Other publications that awarded the film 4/5 stars included The Daily Telegraph and the Evening Standard. 

The American film critic and blogger Jeffrey Wells was so taken by Tyrannosaur after seeing it at the Los Angeles Film Festival that he started 'Hollywood Elsewhere's Tyrannosaur fundraising campaign' with the idea of raising $2,000 to cover the rental of a screening room for Hollywood critics, with the hope of the film gaining recognition. Wells claimed this was the first screening financed by a critic.

Roger Ebert of the Chicago Sun-Times gave the film 3.5 stars out of 4, calling Peter Mullan's performance muscular and unrelenting. He also remarked: "This isn't the kind of movie that even has hope enough to contain a message. There is no message, only the reality of these wounded personalities."

Mark Kermode of BBC Radio 5 Live, hailed the film as one of the 11 Best Films of 2011. Kermode went on to award Olivia Colman Best Actress in his own Annual Kermode Awards. She tied with Tilda Swinton for We Need to Talk About Kevin.

By 18 December 2011, the film had won 21 awards from 28 nominations worldwide. The Guardian included the film in its shortlist for the First Film Award for 2012.

When the BAFTA Award nominations were announced on 17 January 2012, the omission of Olivia Colman in the Best Actress category led to global trending of both Olivia Colman and Tyrannosaur on Twitter.

Accolades

Notes

References

External links

2011 films
2011 crime drama films
2011 independent films
British crime drama films
Films directed by Paddy Considine
Films about domestic violence
British rape and revenge films
Films set in 2010
Films set in England
Screen Gems films
Film4 Productions films
Features based on short films
2011 directorial debut films
2010s English-language films
2010s British films